{{Infobox settlement
| name                   = Ma'arat Umm Hawsh
| native_name            = معراتة أم حوش
| native_name_lang       = ar
| type                   = Village
| pushpin_map            = Syria
| pushpin_label_position = bottom
| pushpin_mapsize        = 250
| pushpin_map_caption    = Location of Ma'arat Umm Hawsh in Syria
| coordinates            = 
| subdivision_type        = Country
| subdivision_name        = 
| subdivision_type1       = Governorate
| subdivision_name1       = Aleppo
| subdivision_type2       = District
| subdivision_name2       = Azaz
| subdivision_type3       = Subdistrict
| subdivision_name3       = Mare'
| parts_type              = Control
| parts_style             = para
| p1                      =  Autonomous Administration of North and East Syria
| elevation_m             = 
| population              = 3403
| population_density_km2  = auto
| population_as_of        = 2004
| population_footnotes    = {{#tag:ref|{{cite web |title=2004 Census Data for ''Nahiya Mare|url=http://www.cbssyr.sy/new%20web%20site/General_census/census_2004/NH/TAB02-25-2004.htm |publisher=Syrian Central Bureau of Statistics |language=ar }} Also available in English: |name=census2004}}
| timezone                = EET
| utc_offset              = +2
| timezone_DST            = EEST
| utc_offset_DST          = +3
| geocode                 = C1641
| website                 = 
}}Ma'arat Umm Hawsh (also spelled Maarateh Om Hosh''') is a village in northern Aleppo Governorate, northwestern Syria. It is administered as part of the Nahiya Mare' in the A'zaz District. Nearby localities include Mare' to the north, Tell Qarah to the southwest, Ahras to the west and Herbel to the northwest. Umm Hawsh has population of 3,542 as per the 2004 census.

References

Populated places in Azaz District